The Khaje Taj od-Din mausoleum is a historical structure in Kashan, Iran. In the 15th century, Khaje Taj od-Din, the brother of founder of Zeyn od-Din minaret, Khaje Zeyn od-Din, built a mosque with minarets and a school on the tombs of two Imamzadehs and some of his contemporary scientists and judges. In the course of time the mosque and minarets and school were destroyed and only two domes remained, which is named Khaje Taj od-Din mausoleum. The outer surface of its eastern dome has tile mosaic. Around the dome, it has been decorated with three rows of raised stucco inscriptions. The inscriptions are some poems in the Naskh and Thuluth scripts.

See also
List of the historical structures in the Isfahan province

References 

Buildings and structures completed in the 15th century
Mausoleums in Iran
Buildings and structures in Kashan